Hepatomegaly is the condition of having an enlarged liver.  It is a non-specific medical sign having many causes, which can broadly be broken down into infection, hepatic tumours, or metabolic disorder. Often, hepatomegaly will present as an abdominal mass. Depending on the cause, it may sometimes present along with jaundice.

Signs and symptoms
The individual may experience many symptoms, including weight loss, poor appetite and lethargy (jaundice and bruising may also be present).

Causes

Among the causes of hepatomegaly are the following:

Infective

Mechanism
The mechanism of hepatomegaly consists of vascular swelling, inflammation (due to the various causes that are infectious in origin) and deposition of (1) non-hepatic cells or (2) increased cell contents (such due to iron in hemochromatosis or hemosiderosis and fat in fatty liver disease).

Diagnosis

Suspicion of hepatomegaly indicates a thorough medical history and physical examination, wherein the latter typically includes an increased liver span. 

On abdominal ultrasonography, the liver can be measured by the maximum dimension on a sagittal plane view through the midclavicular line, which is normally up to 18 cm in adults. It is also possible to measure the cranio-caudal dimension, which is normally up to 15 cm in adults. This can be measured together with the ventro-dorsal dimension (or depth), which is normally up to 13 cm. Also, the caudate lobe is enlarged in many diseases. In the axial plane, the caudate lobe should normally have a cross-section of less than 0.55 of the rest of the liver.

Other ultrasound studies have suggested hepatomegaly as being defined as a longitudinal axis > 15.5 cm at the hepatic midline, or > 16.0 cm at the midclavicular line.

Workup
Blood tests should be done, importantly liver-function series, which will give a good impression of the patient's broad metabolic picture.

A complete blood test can help distinguish intrinsic liver disease from extrahepatic bile-duct obstruction. An ultrasound of the liver can reliably detect a dilated biliary-duct system,
it can also detect the characteristics of a cirrhotic liver.

Computerized tomography (CT) can help to obtain accurate anatomical information, in individuals with hepatomegaly for the purpose of a complete diagnosis.

Treatment

Treatment of hepatomegaly will vary depending on the cause of the liver enlargement and hence accurate diagnosis is the primary concern. In the case of auto-immune liver disease, prednisone and azathioprine may be used for treatment.

In the case of lymphoma the treatment options include single-agent (or multi-agent) chemotherapy and regional radiotherapy, also surgery may be an option in specific situations. Meningococcal group C conjugate vaccine are also used in some cases.

In primary biliary cirrhosis ursodeoxycholic acid helps the bloodstream remove bile which may increase survival in some affected individuals.

See also
 Hepatosplenomegaly
 Liver function tests

References

Further reading

External links 
 Merck Manual: Hepatomegaly

Hepatology
Symptoms and signs: Digestive system and abdomen